Viktor Viktorovich Suloyev (born 26 September 1984) is a Russian professional football coach and a former player. He works as the goalkeepers' coach for FC Avangard Kursk.

Club career
He played in the Russian Football National League for FC Dynamo Bryansk in 2010.

External links
 

1984 births
Living people
Russian footballers
Association football goalkeepers
FC Avangard Kursk players
FC Dynamo Bryansk players